= Roshanak Saberan =

Iranian female kickboxer

Personal information
- Native name: روشنک صابران
- Full name: Roshanak Saberan
- Nationality: Iranian
- Born: October 19, 1996 (age 29) Mashhad, Razavi Khorasan, Iran
- Height: 1.68 m (5 ft 6 in)
- Weight: 64 kg (141 lb)

Sport
- Country: Iran
- Sport: Kickbox
Medal record
Women's athletics
Representing Iran
World Championships
Gold medal – first place	India 2016	-65
Gold medal – first place	India 2016	-65
Gold medal – first place	Turkey 2022	-65
International competitions
Gold medal – first place	Tehran 2016	-70
Gold medal – first place	Turkey 2017	-70
Silver medal – second place	Turkey 2017	-70
Bronze medal – third place	Turkey 2017	-70

Roshanak Saberan (Persian: روشنک صابران) (born 19 October 1996) is a member of the national kickboxing team of the Islamic Republic of Iran.

== Professional Boxing ==
She is a professional boxer holding a BoxRec license since 2024. She is ranked in the OPBF (Oriental and Pacific Boxing Federation) rankings, an organization affiliated with the WBC, which includes boxers from 23 countries across Asia and Oceania.

In December 2025, she reached 4th place (Silver Champion) in the Super Welterweight division. In 2026, she rose to 3rd place (Silver Champion) for three consecutive months (February, March, and April) and maintained this ranking in July 2026.

== Achievements ==
- (gold) World Championships in kickboxing weight 65 - in India 2016
- (gold) Kyokushin karate world in body contact style weight 65 - in India 2016
- (silver) Kyokushin kata international weight 70 - in Turkey 2017
- (gold) Kyokushin committee international weight 70 - in Turkey 2017
- (gold) International Kyokushin karate committee of weight 70 - in Tehran 2016
- (bronze) International Kyokushin Karate Championships (kwf) of weight 70 - in Turkey 2017
- Setting the world record of consecutive boxing for 64 hours and 27 minutes in Iran 2020
- (gold) the World Full Contact Kickboxing Championships in Turkey 2022
- Licensed professional boxing champion in boxrec 2024
